Lachesis acrochorda, also known as the Chocoan bushmaster, is a venomous pit viper species found in Central and South America.

Taxonomy
It was formerly considered a synonym of Lachesis stenophrys.

Description 
Lachesis acrochorda has a light brown head and black postocular stripes that can range from 1-2 scales wide. The highest recorded length of a male individual in Ecuador was 2.327 m; for females it was 2.342 m.

Distribution and habitat 
L. acrochorda is found in Panama, north and western Colombia (in the Departments of Chocó, Cauca and Antioquia) and northwestern Ecuador in lowland forest, premontane wet forest, and montane wet forest, mostly in mature forests.

Venom
The venom of this species is extremely dangerous in that a snakebite incident will result in a 90% chance of death. Lachesis acrochorda venom can cause serious side effects, such as vasodilation and blood anti-coagulation.

References

acrochorda
Snakes of Central America
Snakes of South America
Reptiles of Colombia
Reptiles of Ecuador
Reptiles of Panama